Fiorenzo is a masculine Italian given name. The feminine derivative is Fiorenza. 

Notable people with the name include:

Fiorenzo (African saint), 5th-century North African bishop and saint
Fiorenzo Aliverti (born 1957), Italian cyclist
Fiorenzo Angelini (1916–2014), Italian cardinal
Fiorenzo Bava Beccaris (1831–1924), Italian general
Fiorenzo Carpi (1918–1997), Italian composer and pianist
Fiorenzo Chatrer (born 1987), Dutch footballer
Fiorenzo Di Giovanni (born 1967), French rower
Fiorenzo di Lorenzo (c. 1440 – 1522), Italian painter
Fiorenzo Fiorentini (1920–2003), Italian actor, writer, composer, screenwriter and radio personality
Fiorenzo Magni (1920–2012), Italian cyclist
Fiorenzo Marini (1914–1991), Italian fencer
Fiorenzo Maschera (1540–1584), Italian composer
Fiorenzo Serra (1921–2005), Italian film director
Fiorenzo Stolfi (born 1956), Sammarinese politician
Fiorenzo Tomea (1910–1960), Italian painter

See also
Saint-Florent, Haute-Corse, a commune in Corsica, also called San Fiorenzo.

Given names derived from plants or flowers
Italian masculine given names